Helge Jørgensen (27 January 1912 – 27 November 1969) was a Danish footballer. He played in two matches for the Denmark national football team from 1937 to 1938.

References

External links
 

1912 births
1969 deaths
Danish men's footballers
Denmark international footballers
Place of birth missing
Association footballers not categorized by position